The Izhorians (sg. ižoralain, inkeroin, ižora, ingermans, ingers, ingrian, pl. ižoralaizet), along with the Votes, are a Finnic indigenous people native to Ingria. Small numbers can still be found in the western part of Ingria, between the Narva and Neva rivers in northwestern Russia. Although in English oftentimes sharing a common name with the Finns of Ingria, these two groups are distinct from one another.

History 

The history of the Izhorians is bound to the history of Ingria. It is supposed that shortly after 1000 AD the Izhorians moved from Karelia to the west and south-west. In 1478, the Novgorod Republic, where Ingrians had settled, was united with the Grand Duchy of Moscow, and some of the Izhorians were transferred to the east. The establishment of St Petersburg in 1703 had a great influence on Izhorian culture. World War II had the biggest impact on Izhorians, as devastating battles (such as the Siege of Leningrad) took place on their territory.

In 1848, P. von Köppen counted 17,800 Izhorians, and by 1926 there were 26,137 Izhorians in the Russian SFSR. In the 1959 census, however, only 1,100 Izhorians were counted in the USSR. In 1989, 820 self-designated Izhorians, 302 of whom were speakers of the Ingrian language were registered. 449 Izhorians lived in the territory of the USSR. According to the 2002 Russian Census, there were 327 Izhorians in Russia, of whom 177 lived in Leningrad oblast and 53 in St Petersburg. There were also 812 Izhorians in Ukraine according to Ukrainian Census (2001) (more than in Russian Federation and Estonia altogether) and a further 358 Izhorians in Estonia.

Language 

Their language, close to Karelian, is used primarily by members of the older generation. Izhorian (also called Ingrian), along with Finnish, Ludic, Karelian and Vepsian, belongs to the Northern Finnic group of the Uralic languages.

In 1932–1937, a Latin-based orthography for the Izhorian language existed, taught in schools of the Soikinsky Peninsula and the area around the mouth of the Luga River. Several textbooks were published including a grammar of the language in 1936. However, in 1937 the Izhorian written language was abolished.

Religion 
The Izhorians and the Votes are generally Eastern Orthodox, while the other Baltic Finns inhabitanting Ingria, the Ingrian Finns, are generally Lutheran. Some pre-Christian traditions exist also.

References

External links 
 Izhorians in the Red Book of the Peoples of the Russian Empire
 Estonian National Museum 
 V. Cherniavskij, "Izoran keel (Ittseopastaja)/Ижорский язык (Самоучитель) (Ingrian Self-Taught Book)" 
Virtual ingrian

Ethnic groups in Russia
Indigenous peoples of Europe